After... is an adult Japanese visual novel developed by Ciel which was released on June 27, 2003, playable on the PC as a CD or a DVD.The early DVD version includes a guide book and soundtrack CD and the early CD version includes a guide book and a mouse pad. Subsequent enhanced ports to the Dreamcast and to the PlayStation 2 as After... ~Wasureemu Kizuna~ were released. Both ports feature their own exclusive characters and new scenarios not in the original PC release.

Gameplay
The gameplay requires little interaction from the player as most of the duration of the game is spent on simply reading the text that will appear on the screen; this text represents either dialogue between the various characters, or the inner thoughts of the protagonist. Every so often, the player will come to a "decision point" where he or she is given the chance to choose from options that are displayed on the screen, typically two to three at a time. During these times, gameplay pauses until a choice is made that furthers the plot in a specific direction, depending on which choice the player makes.

Characters

Release
After.. was first introduced in Japan on June 27, 2003, as a CD-ROM or a DVD-ROM playable on a Microsoft Windows PC. Two consumer console versions for the Dreamcast and PlayStation 2 with adult content removed were developed by Pionesoft and released on February 26, 2004, in limited and regular edition versions. Both versions had the title After... ~Wasureemu Kizuna~  (After...～忘れえぬ絆～, lit. "After... ~Unforgettable Bond~"). A version playable as a DVD TV game entitled After... DVDPG was released on February 25, 2007; and a version playable as a Blu-ray TV game was released on May 21, 2010. On August 26, 2005, a version containing both the original game and its fandisc called After... -Story Edition- was released.

After... Sweet Kiss, a fandisc for the original game released on December 19, 2003. It contains side stories for the three main heroines along with desk accessories.

Anime
After... was adapted as a hentai OVA by Milky Label Animation. It was released on two DVDs between August 25, 2007, and January 25, 2008. Media Blasters licensed the two-episode OVA and released it in the United States thru Kitty Media on Blu-ray and DVD on September 28, 2021, with a new english dub featuring American voiceover actresses, Yara Naika and Diana Lockheart.

References

External links
 Official page for the original version 
 Official page for the After...  ~Wasureemu Kizuna~ versions 
 MS Pictures After... the Animationvol. 1 page
 MS Pictures After... the Animationvol. 2 page
 
 

2003 video games
Bishōjo games
Dreamcast games
DVD interactive technology
Eroge
Japan-exclusive video games
PlayStation 2 games
Video game remakes
Video games developed in Japan
Video games scored by Keishi Yonao
Visual novels
Windows games
Single-player video games